Joshua Weinstein may refer to:
Josh Weinstein (born 1966), American television writer and producer, known for his work on The Simpsons
Joshua Weinstein (director), independent filmmaker who directed the feature film Menashe (2017) and the documentary Driver's Wanted (2012)
J. Elvis Weinstein (born 1971), American writer and performer, known for his work on Mystery Science Theater 3000
Precision Tunes, real name Joshua Weinstein, New York-based music producer